Bear in the Big Blue House is an American children's television series created by Mitchell Kriegman and produced by Jim Henson Television for Disney Channel's Playhouse Disney preschool television block. Debuting on October 20, 1997, it aired its last episode on April 28, 2006. Reruns of the program continued to air on Playhouse Disney until May 6, 2007.

In 2004, The Jim Henson Company sold the rights to the show, including characters, content library and copyrights, to The Walt Disney Company; it is now owned by The Muppets Studio, a subsidiary of Disney that also owns, and is named after, The Muppets characters and copyrights.

Plot
Bear lives in the Big Blue House where he is caregiver for his friends Ojo, a bear cub; Tutter, a mouse; Treelo, a lemur; otters Pip and Pop; and narrator Shadow. He and his friends have many adventures together. Those normally include solving problems, sharing, cooperating with each other, and developing social/life skills.

Each episode opens with the welcome song, Bear detecting a scent in the viewers (which he likens to a pleasant smell) and appearance of the characters.  Each show focuses on a theme (ex; "sleep", "doctors", "Thanksgiving") which folds into a lesson at the end. Songs and jokes accompany the episode.  The character "Shadow" narrates a segment with shadow puppets in each episode. Most of the segments are in song, while some are simply a short story relating to the episode's theme. At the end of the program, Bear sings the goodbye song with Luna, the moon.

Episodes

Characters

Main

 Bear (performed by Noel MacNeal) – The protagonist of the series, he is a large bear who is very kind and lovable. He is tall and has light brown fur. Bear acts a caregiver to Pip, Pop, Ojo, Treelo and Tutter. He was designed by Paul Andrejco.
 Tutter (performed by Peter Linz) – A small light blue mouse who loves cheese. He lives in a mousehole in the kitchen of Bear's house. He is considered the show's breakout character. He was designed and built by Paul Andrejco.
 Pip and Pop (performed by Peter Linz and Tyler Bunch) – Two purple otter twins who live in the otter pond by the Big Blue House. They were designed by Paul Andrejco.
 Ojo (performed by Vicki Eibner) – A curious red bear cub who has a wild imagination and is good friends with Treelo. She was designed and built by Paul Andrejco.
 Treelo (performed by Tyler Bunch) – A white, blue, and green lemur who is playful, loves to dance, always active and good friends with Ojo. He was designed by Paul Andrejco and built by Kip Rathke.
 Shadow (performed by Peter Linz, voiced by Tara Mooney) – A shadow girl who is always laughing, telling stories, and sneaking up on Bear.
 Luna the Moon (operated by Peter Linz, voiced by Lynne Thigpen) – A talking Moon. At the end of every episode Bear walks out onto the balcony and discusses the episode's theme with her. They sing "The Goodbye Song" while playing a montage of the day's events. She was designed by Paul Andrejco and built by Ed Christie. "Luna" means "Moon" in Italian, Spanish, and Latin.
 Ray the Sun (operated by Peter Linz, voiced by Geoffrey Holder) – A talking Sun who would often rise (or set) at the beginning of some episodes, starting from Season Two. He will also occasionally tell Bear what the weather will be like throughout the day. Sometimes, he also sings the "Good Morning song". He was designed by Paul Andrejco.

Supporting

 Grandma Flutter (performed by Alice Dinnean in 1997–1998, Vicki Eibner from 1998–2003) – Tutter's grandmother who has a dance called "The Grandma Mambo". She has a granddaughter named Baby Blotter. She was designed by Paul Andrejco and built by Michael Schupbach and Kip Rathke.
 Cousin Whiner (performed by Victor Yerrid) – One of Tutter's cousins.
 Uncle "Jet Set Tutter" (performed by Tim Lagasse) – Tutter's uncle.
 Doc Hogg (performed by Tyler Bunch) – A pig who is the local physician. He was designed by Paul Andrejco and built by Eric Englehardt.
 Benny the Bat (performed by James Kroupa) – A fruit bat living in the attic of the house.
 Jeremiah Tortoise (performed by James Kroupa) – An elderly tortoise living in Woodland Valley.
 Lois (performed by Vicki Eibner) – A Blue-footed booby living in Woodland Valley. She usually mishears things that her friends are saying.
 Annette (performed by Vicki Eibner) – An armadillo who runs the Woodland Valley Cinema and is very shy.
 Henrietta Vanderpreen (performed by Vicki Eibner) – An ostrich who is the editor of Woodland House Wonderful, a magazine of interest to residents of Woodland Valley.
 Skippy - A blind red squirrel living in Woodland Valley that wears sunglasses and uses a cane. He is good friends with Treelo.
 Big Old Bullfrog (performed by Peter Linz) – A bullfrog living in Woodland Valley.
 Jacques the Beaver (performed by Peter Linz) – A French beaver living in Woodland Valley.
 Miss Maxwell (performed by Jennifer Barnhart) – A mouse who is a teacher at the Mouse School.
 Rita Mouse (performed by Anney McKilligan) – A mouse who attends Mouse School with Tutter. She needs some help with painting but is very good at soccer.
 Keisha (performed by Vicki Eibner) – A mouse who attends Mouse School with Tutter.
 Moss (performed by Noel MacNeal) – A mouse who attends Mouse School with Tutter.
 Cousin Jitter -
 Harry the Duck (performed by Eric Jacobson) – A duck who has been seen several times through the show who addresses bear as "Mister Bear" and quacks repeatedly when he is upset. He was designed by Paul Andrejco.
 Otto and Etta Otter (performed by James Kroupa and Vicki Eibner) – Pip and Pop's grandparents who run the Woodland Valley Library.
 Ursa (operated by Matt Vogel, voiced by Carmen Osbahr) – Bear's old friend from Mexico that appeared twice in "And to All a Good Night" and "You Never Know."
 Yukker Tutter (performed by Eric Jacobson) - One of Tutter's relatives. He is distinguishable by the bucket he wears on his head.

Several of these characters appeared in a music video for the We Are Family Foundation. Bear also appeared as a celebrity in the 2002 revival of The Hollywood Squares; he notably appeared in Whoopi Goldberg's final episode.

Locations
 Woodland Valley – Woodland Valley is the area/village in which events on the show are situated. The Big Blue House is the main landmark, but there is also a general store, post office, mall, library, movie theater, mouse school, and many other locations. Many of these are not seen (or not seen in much detail) until the fourth season. In "History, Herstory, Bearstory," Jeremiah Tortoise reveals that his grandfather Hepahestus Tortoise was the town's first settler. He initially decided to call it Who'd Have Thought I Would Land in This Valley Valley, but decided it was too long and changed it to Would Land Valley. Jeremiah says he's been trying to get the official spelling changed for years. Sequoia City is a neighboring town of Woodland Valley.
 The Big Blue House – The Big Blue House is where most of the main action of the series Bear in the Big Blue House takes place. Located in Woodland Valley, it looks somewhat small from the outside, but large and roomy on the inside. Bear lives here and runs a sort of daycare/group-home. Tutter has his mousehole in the house, while most of the other young characters only spend the day here. The Big Blue House is often described as warm and cozy. The Big Blue House has five rooms. The kitchen and the living room are downstairs. Bear has his very own swing where he sometimes sits and reads in the living room. Tutter's mousehole is in the kitchen. The front-door, where Bear greets the viewers at the beginning of each episode, is also downstairs. Upstairs are the bathroom and Bear's bedroom. Finally, Bear stores various items in the attic. There's also a landing there where Bear visits each night to talk with his friend Luna, the moon. Bear once gave the following directions on how to reach the Big Blue House: just take the path that leads into the woods, make the right past the big oak, go right, past the pond and then you're there.
 Otter Pond – Pip and Pop often hang out at the Otter Pond. It is also home to Harry the Duck, his mom, and his sister, Hallie. Additionally, various other creatures sometimes hang out at the Otter Pond, including Benny, Christine, and Big Old Bullfrog. The general area of the Otter Pond is filled with plants, including bushes filled with berries. Bear and Ojo visit there to pick berries for triple-berry pie in "If at First You Don't Succeed..." The Otter Pond was the site of a special nighttime party in "And to All a Good Night."
 Woodland Valley Library – The Woodland Valley Library is a place for everyone in Woodland Valley to go for research and resources. It is managed by Otto and Etta Otter. It is located directly in the center of the town. In addition to books, it also offers DVDs, CD-ROMs, Internet access and various other resources. Woodland Valley Library is featured in the two-part "Welcome to Woodland Valley" story. A tree falls on the library and the entire community works together to help get it cleaned up. There is damage to the collection and so donations are made. When Ojo discovers two unnamed opossums (voiced by Gilbert Gottfried and Brad Garrett) living in the tree that fell, the tree itself is made into a part of the library as the Book Nook. The library is featured in the song, "Everything's Great About the Library." Harry the Duck wonders what's so great about the library and so Tutter, Treelo, Pip and Pop sing a song to explain it. They tell him that there's something for everyone at the library, but the library is a place to read, so you have to keep your voices down; no disturbing allowed.
 Woodland Valley Cinema – The Woodland Valley Cinema is a local movie theater for everyone in Woodland Valley to relax and watch films. Annette is the owner of the movie theater and does all the jobs from box office to ticket taker. The screening room has three rows of seats in the auditorium and a concession stand. The concession stand accepts dollars and cents as payment instead of clams, Woodland Valley's official currency. Woodland Valley Cinema was first introduced in "Welcome to Woodland Valley." However, in "Words, Words, Words," the Woodland Valley Gazette says the movie theater is named "Woodland Valley Multiplex."
 Woodland Valley Post Office – The Woodland Valley Post Office is Woodland Valley's own facility for posting, receipt, sorting, handling, transmission or delivery of mail. The post office also sells stamps for stamp collections and does clammygrams if asked. Jeremiah Tortoise works there in addition to running his general store. Most of the mail ends up arriving late due to Jeremiah Tortoise, who is slow at delivering the mail. In "A Strange Bird," Bear received a two-week-old postcard from a penguin named Puck from the South Pole and finds out Puck is paying a visit to the Big Blue House today. The store accepts clams, Woodland Valley's official currency, as payment and it has to be exact change only. Woodland Valley Post Office was first introduced in "Read My Book" and was seen more in later episodes.
 Mouse School – The Mouse School is a fun place to learn for Tutter and his classmates, including Keisha, Luke, Lily, Rita, and Moss. Learning and other activities are overseen by Miss Maxwell. It's a one-room schoolhouse, but there's plenty of places to play and an occasional field trip. Tutter first begins attending Mouse School in the fourth season. He joins the school soccer team, coached by Bear, but considers quitting in "Show Your Stuff." In "Teacher Appreciation Day," Tutter joins with Lily to figure out a way to show Miss Maxwell how much the mice kids all appreciate her. Tutter holds a sleepover for his Mouse School classmates in "Tutter's First Big Sleepover Bash."
 Doc Hogg's Office – Doc Hogg's Office is where Doc Hogg treats his patients on Bear in the Big Blue House. Bear, Tutter and Ojo visited the office when Tutter hurt his tail in "That Healing Feeling." The office has a waiting room with toys and books to keep children entertained.
 Sequoia City – Sequoia City is a neighboring town of Woodland Valley, and Woodland Valley may be considered a suburb of it. They are known to have a baseball team called the "Big Bats." Sequoia City is the hometown for two radio stations that reach Woodland Valley; WWTL (a news and weather station) and Bear's favorite music station WCHA-CHA. Sequoia City was one of the locations on a signpost in "The Great Bandini." The other location names on that signpost (other than the library) have not been used again, but Sequoia City has been mentioned in other episodes. Bear and the kids of the Big Blue House went on vacation at a nice hotel in Sequoia City in "This Is Your Life, Bear."
 River City – River City is a town mentioned on Bear in the Big Blue House. Not much is known about it, but Grandma Flutter was an all-star player for their baseball team: the River City Rodents.

Cancellation
Bear in the Big Blue House was initially produced from 1997 to 2003. The sudden death of Lynne Thigpen, who voiced 'Luna' the Moon, led to production being put on hiatus for three years, along with a planned film.

In 2005, two years after Thigpen's death, Tara Mooney, who voiced Shadow, told Irish radio station Today FM that "the crew's hearts just weren't in it anymore".

Spin-off
After the hiatus and the spin-off Breakfast with Bear, a final run of new episodes aired on the Disney Channel in April 2006, with the last episode airing on April 28, 2006. Repeats of the show ceased altogether in May 2007 (December 2010 in the UK). Thigpen was posthumously nominated for a Daytime Emmy Award for voicing Luna.

Songs 
 "Welcome to the Blue House"
 "What's That Smell?"
 "The Bear Cha-Cha-Cha"
 "Dear Grandma"
 "Happy, Happy Birthday"
 "Good Morning"
 "Brush, Brush Bree"
 "Look at You Now"
 "That's My Name"
 "Everybody Say Ah"
 "What's In The Mail Today?"
 "Making Sense Of The World"
 "The Grandma Mambo"
 "Remember When"
 "The Otter Dancing School"
 "Shadow's Lullaby"
 "When I'm Older"
 "Everybody In The Tub"
 "Rhythm In The Air"
 "Why Can't The Dirt Just Leave Me Alone?"
 "Imagine That"
 "Smellorama"
 "When I Find The Great Lost Cheese"
 "Under Your Blanket"
 "Love Is Incredible"
 "Your Grandma And Grandpa"
 "What Kind Of Mouse Am I?"
 "Picture This"
 "Hello Doctor"
 "Worth The Wait"
 "Friends Forever"
 "Surprise!"
 "What's Mine Is Yours"
 "The Toileteers"
 "Next Stop Dreamland"
 "Great to Be at Home"
 "Go to Bed, Sleepy Head"
 "Take Time to Smell the Cheese"
 "Clean Up the House"
 "Oops! I Goofed Again"
 "Quiet Time"
 "Otter Love"
 "Shape of a Bear"
 "Baby, Baby"
 "When You Make Yourself a Friend"
 "Oh, Boy"
 "You Go, Ojo"
 "Need a Little Help Today"
 "Goodbye Song"

International airings
The show was shown throughout the world including in the United Kingdom on Playhouse Disney UK and Channel 5, on the Australian Broadcasting Corporation in Australia and on RTÉ Two in Ireland.

Awards
Daytime Emmy Awards
2000 – Outstanding Sound Mixing – Peter Hefter and John Alberts (won) (Tied with Bill Nye the Science Guy and Honey, I Shrunk the Kids: The TV Show)
2000 – Outstanding Directing in a Children's Series – Mitchell Kriegman, Richard A. Fernandes and Dean Gordon (won)
2003 – Outstanding Directing in a Children's Series – Mitchell Kriegman and Dean Gordon (won)
 Parent's Choice Gold Award Winner – 2000, 2002 
 Director's Guild Award – Outstanding Directorial Achievement in Children's Programs - "Episode 225: Love Is All You Need"

References

External links

 
 

1990s American children's television series
2000s American children's television series
1997 American television series debuts
2006 American television series endings
1990s preschool education television series
2000s preschool education television series
American children's adventure television series
American children's fantasy television series
American children's musical television series
American preschool education television series
American television shows featuring puppetry
American television series with live action and animation
Personal development television series
Television shows adapted into plays
Television shows adapted into video games
English-language television shows
Disney Channel original programming
Disney Junior original programming
Television series about bears
Television series about mice and rats
Fictional primates
Fictional otters
Talking animals in fiction
Works about friendship
Television shows set in the United States
Forests in fiction
Television series by Disney–ABC Domestic Television
Television series by The Jim Henson Company